Felix Olof Allan Nelson Beijmo (born 31 January 1998) is a Swedish professional footballer who plays as a defender for AGF, on loan from Malmö FF.

Club career

Youth career
Beijmo started out playing for IF Brommapojkarna at age seven, leaving his local club  Ängby IF. He took part in the TV4-show called Fotbollsfabriken (The Football factory) which plotted the best 15-years old players in the academy of IF Brommapojkarna.

Djurgårdens IF
On 30 March 2017, Beijmo signed a four year-deal with Allsvenskan side Djurgårdens IF. He chose Djurgården after stiff competition for his signature from Malmö FF among others. On 10 May 2018, he played as Djurgården beat Malmö FF 3–0 in the Swedish Cup Final.

Werder Bremen
In June 2018, Beijmo joined Bundesliga side Werder Bremen for the 2018–19 season having agreed a "long-term" contract. The reported fee of around €3 million made him the most expensive defender ever to leave the Swedish top flight Allsvenskan.

Loan to Malmö FF
In August 2019, he returned to Sweden having agreed a loan until the end of the season with Malmö FF.

Loan to Greuther Fürth
On 31 January 2020, the last day of the 2019–20 winter transfer period, Beijmo was loaned out to SpVgg Greuther Fürth until the end of the 2019–20 season.

Malmö FF
In August 2020, Beijmo returned to Sweden re-joining Malmö FF. He signed a three-year contract.

In January 2023, Beijmo signed for Supeliga club AGF on loan until the summer.

International career
Beijmo has represented both the Sweden national under-17 football team, Sweden national under-19 football team and Sweden national under-21 football team.

Career statistics

Club

Honours
Djurgårdens IF
 Svenska Cupen: 2017–18

Malmö FF
Allsvenskan: 2020, 2021
Svenska Cupen: 2021–22

References

External links
 

1998 births
Living people
Association football defenders
Footballers from Stockholm
Swedish footballers
Sweden under-21 international footballers
Sweden youth international footballers
Allsvenskan players
Djurgårdens IF Fotboll players
IF Brommapojkarna players
SV Werder Bremen players
SV Werder Bremen II players
Malmö FF players
Aarhus Gymnastikforening players
SpVgg Greuther Fürth players
2. Bundesliga players
Regionalliga players
Superettan players
Ettan Fotboll players
Swedish expatriate footballers
Swedish expatriate sportspeople in Germany
Swedish expatriate sportspeople in Denmark
Expatriate footballers in Germany
Expatriate footballers in Denmark